Jung Sang-sook (born 26 February 1980) is a South Korean retired para table tennis player. She won a silver medal at the 2012 Summer Paralympics.

She was disabled in an accident when she was in high school. She began playing in 2007.

References 

1980 births
Paralympic medalists in table tennis
South Korean female table tennis players
Table tennis players at the 2012 Summer Paralympics
Medalists at the 2012 Summer Paralympics
Paralympic table tennis players of South Korea
Living people
Paralympic silver medalists for South Korea
People from Siheung
Sportspeople from Gyeonggi Province
People with paraplegia
21st-century South Korean women